The Mobile Legends: Bang Bang Southeast Asia Cup 2021 or commonly known as MSC 2021 was the fourth annual regional Southeast Asian Tournament for Mobile Legends: Bang Bang. Due to the COVID-19 pandemic, MSC 2021 was held virtually via an online livestream that was streamed and viewed by millions in the region. With a total prize pool of $150,000 after Moonton's announcement of a prize pool increase, the games were held from 7–13 June 2021. The Philippine team of Execration won the Tournament against another Philippine team in Blacklist International with Kelra as the winning MVP. This is the second title that the Philippines have won after Aether Main won the MSC Cup in 2018.

Background 
Previous MSC tournaments were held in Face-to-face and public viewing on public venues in 2017, 2018 and 2019. However, with the Pandemic circulating worldwide, this is the first tournament to be featured online via livestream. Then-current SEA Cup Champions ONIC Esports were the longest champions in MSC History after the 2020 MSC Tournament was cancelled on May 11 by Moonton because of the pandemic. MSC 2021 would push through to continue with the prize pool being increased from $120,000 to $150,000.

Format 
Twelve teams across Southeast Asia were qualified for the tournament. The MPL regions in Malaysia, Indonesia, Singapore and the Philippines had their respective Champion and Runner-ups represent their regions, while the non-MPL teams in Cambodia, Laos, Thailand, and Vietnam were directly invited.
 Teams are grouped into four groups of three teams each.
 Group Stage: (June 7–9th, 2021)
 Teams play in a single round-robin, facing each other in a  format.
 At the end of the group stage, the top team in each group qualified for the Upper Bracket Semifinals.
 The next two teams in each group proceeded in the play-ins, also in a  format. The winner of that series moved on to the Lower Bracket Playoffs, while the loser was eliminated.
 Playoffs: (June 11–13th, 2021)
 Lower Bracket Rounds 1–2, Semifinals and the Upper Bracket Semifinals were in a  format.
 The Upper and Lower Bracket Finals were in a  format.
 The Grand Finals was a  format.

Teams Participating

Results

Group stage 

Source:

Play-in Tournament 

Source:

Playoffs 
All matches were a  series, except for the Upper and Lower Bracket Finals which were a  series, and the Grand Finals which was a  series.

Source:

With the win of Execration in the Grand Finals, the Philippines obtained its second MSC Cup in 2 years after Aether Main in 2018. This was the second time in MSC History wherein two teams from the same nation went head-to-head in the Grand Finals, the first was in 2019 when ONIC Esports and Louvre Esports faced off each other in the Finals. Both teams are from Indonesia.

Viewership 
MSC 2021 was streamed online for a widespread reach and due to the COVID-19 pandemic MSC was forced to be hosted digitally. MSC 2021 recorded a record high of viewership, average viewership, and Hours Watched in MSC history. The tournaments were live steamed on YouTube, Facebook Gaming and NimoTV alongside TikTok and VK Live.

High turnouts of viewership were from the teams competing in the competition. EVOS Esports of Indonesia has average viewers of over 986,314, followed by Execration, Blacklist International, Bigetron and RSG MY. EVOS, Execration, Blacklist have record high of viewership of over 500,000 viewers.

References 

Mobile Legends: Bang Bang competitions
Sports events affected by the COVID-19 pandemic